Bharathchandran I.P.S is a 2005 Indian  Malayalam-language action drama film written, directed and produced by Renji Panicker. It is a sequel to the 1994 film Commissioner and Suresh Gopi reprises the title character. It also features Sai Kumar, Rajan P. Dev, Mamukkoya, Shreya Reddy, and Lalu Alex in supporting roles. The background score was composed by C. Rajamani. The film was a major commercial success at the box office and ran for more than 100 days in theatres.

Plot 
After killing Mohan Thomas to avenge his colleague Muhammad Iqbal's death.  Commissioner Bharathchandran gets acquitted from suspension and gets married with his girlfriend Indu and leads a happy life, until Indu is murdered by Mohan Thomas's goons, where Bharathchandran decide to raises his 10 year-old daughter who amusingly named as Indu, all by himself. 

Mayambaram Baba, an iconic Muslim leader in Malabar, Kerala is murdered by a hired assassin named Kala Purohit Khan, amidst tight security in the premises of a special court in Mangalore where he was supposed to give evidence about the foul play behind an earlier communal riots by Janab Hyderali Hassan, who runs a crime syndicate. Hyderali felt that their existence would be questioned if Baba reveals the truths about the communal riots incited by them. As a matter of fact, the communal riots following Baba's murder are triggered and intensified by Hyderali himself, to throw the region into a state of chaos. Hyderali has other sinister motives also, like having the huge amount of land left behind by the fleeing population to himself for building a private sea port through which he hopes to pump illicit counterfeit money, drug trade and smuggling arms into the state. 

The state's CM Thomas Chacko, entrusts the investigation of Mayambaram Baba's murder to Bharathchandran. Bharathchandran, along with officers ASP Anwar and DYSP Pookkoya report to IG Habib Basheer, who is entrusted as a guardian to Bharathchandran after the death of Bharathchandran's former mentor and I.G Balachandran. Bharathchandran works his way into the hierarchy of the Hyderali syndicate, starting with Shweta Nachappa, a Karnataka cop, who was on duty on the day of Baba's murder and actually seemed to know that he would be murdered earlier. Hyderali kills Shweta after he finds out that Bharathchandran is trailing her.

Later, It is revealed that Thomas Chacko is also in cahoots with Hyderali. Habib Basheer is killed while trying to save Bharathchandran from Kala Purohit's gang. Enraged,  Bharatchandran confronts Hyderali and also brings the captured Kala Purohit, with Anwar and Pookkoya's help. Bharathchandran gives an empty revolver to Kala Purohit and asks him to shoot Hyderali. Kala tries to shoot Bharathchandran, but is later killed by Bharathchandran, who soon kills Hyderali in front of a frightened Thomas Chacko.

Cast 

 Suresh Gopi as DIG Bharath Chandran IPS, City Police Commissioner
 Lalu Alex as IG Habeeb Basheer IPS
 Sai Kumar as Janab Hyderali Hassan
 Rajan P. Dev as DySP Pookkoya
 Shreya Reddy as SP Hema Viswanath IPS
 Madhu Warrier as ASP Anwar IPS
 Vijayaraghavan as Thomas Chacko, Chief Minister of Kerala
 Akhila as Swetha Nachappa IPS
 Mamukkoya as Kunjeeswaran Pillai
 Niranjana as Indu (Daughter of Bharathchandran)
 Prabha Dutt as Jasmine Mary Cherian
 Urmila Unni as Subhadra Habeeb
 Nivia Rebin as Habeeb's daughter
 Kundara Johny as IG Rajan Koshy IPS
 Subair as MLA Mayin Kutty
 Ajay Rathnam as Kala Purohit Khan
 Kollam Ajith as Udayan shetty
 V. K. Sreeraman as Mayamparam Baba
 Kozhikode Narayanan Nair as Shekharji
 Ravindran as Devan Menon, Customs Officer
 T. P. Madhavan as Vakkalam Moosa (Minister)
 Balachandran Chullikkadu as Mudoor Sidhan
 Meghna Nair as Lekha
 Priyanka as Susheela
 Santhakumari
 Ratheesh as Mohan Thomas (mentioned only)
 Shobhana as Indu Kurup (mentioned only)
 M. G. Soman as I. G. Balachandran (mentioned only)

Box office
The film collected 2.5 crore in distributor's share from 50 screens on the 7th day, and it became the highest grossing film at that time.

Notes

References

External links 

2005 films
2005 action thriller films
2000s Malayalam-language films
Indian sequel films
TheKingCommi3
Films set in Kerala
Films set in Karnataka
Fictional portrayals of the Kerala Police
Indian action drama films